Dyke is a village in the South Kesteven district of Lincolnshire, England. Dyke is within Bourne civil parish.

The name Dyke arises from its lying on Car Dyke, a once much larger Roman ditch, which runs along the western edge of The Fens.  The section of Car Dyke between Dyke and Bourne is a scheduled ancient monument.

For population statistics Dyke, Twenty, South Fen, and Spalding road outside Bourne are taken together; Dyke is the largest of these settlements. The 2001 census recorded a  population of 1,598, falling to 1,541 at the 2011 census.

Dyke and Dyke Fen fall within the drainage area of the Black Sluice Internal Drainage Board.

A new fountain was built on the green in the centre of the village to mark the millennium.

Dyke's public house is The Wishing Well Inn.

References

External links

"Dyke", homepages.which.net. Retrieved 22 July 2011

Villages in Lincolnshire
South Kesteven District